Netaji Subhash Engineering College or NSEC is a graduate and undergraduate engineering college of eastern India located in Kolkata, West Bengal, India. Established in 1998, it is situated at Techno City, Panchpota, Garia in the southern part of Kolkata.

Academics

NBA and TEQIP
In 2005 the college was given accreditation from the National Board of Accreditation (NBA) for B.Tech in Computer Science and Engineering, Electronics and Communication Engineering, Electrical Engineering. In April 2008 the same accreditation was given for information technology. The college was also selected for an educational grant from the World Bank in its Technical Education Quality Improvement Program (TEQIP) as one of the few institutes in West Bengal. NSEC ranked Second in Project Implementation of TEQIP (following Jadavpur University which achieved first place in West Bengal).

Ranking

The institute is ranked among 251-300 rankband in the National Institutional Ranking Framework (NIRF)  2020 Engineering Ranking.

Industry Academia Partnership Initiative
In 2008, Infosys launched the Campus Connect program, an industry-academia partnership initiative, with 60 colleges in India. The college was one of the institutes that was selected for the program and as of 2015, the program is still active.

Organisation and administration 
Department of Computer Sciences
 Doctoral Program (PhD) in Cellular Automata, Web Intelligence, Distributed Computing, Neural Networks, Artificial Intelligence, Multimedia Systems and Compiler Design.

Department of Electrical Engineering
 Doctoral program (PhD) in Electrical Power System, Electrical Machines and Control Engineering.

Department of Basic Engineering Sciences
 3-years undergraduate program covering all branches of Science, the knowledge of which are required in the field of Engineering.

Student life

Phoenix, the Official Tech Club

The history of PHOENIX, the official Tech Club of the college, dates back to 2006, when seven students formed a platform that would think beyond the academic courses that everyone studies in college. Thus began Phoenix — the Tech Club. Today, every student of NSEC is essentially a member of Phoenix and the club is well known in other tech colleges of the state.
The functioning of Phoenix stands on its various pillars: The PR Team, the Creative Team, the Database Team, the Web Team, the C Team, the Photography Team etc. Today, besides organising the three big events (Avenir – the annual Tech Fest, Brainstormer – The Inter College Quiz Competition and Kurukshetra – the Intra College Debate Competition) Phoenix holds forums. Presently these are: The C Forum, The Robonix Forum, The SSPD forum and the Web Designing Forum. "Come, Let's Rise", is the motto of the club

Annual Tech Fest
The Annual Tech Fest Avenir is one of the earliest Tech Fests of Kolkata was set up with help from Kshitij of Indian Institute of Technology, Kharagpur. The tech fest has seen participants from almost all major engineering colleges of West Bengal. It started in 2003 with a participation of 100 people. Over the years it has grown enormously with Avenir 2014 seeing participants count of over 4000 from all major engineering colleges of the state but organised once in 4 years.

Reunions

 Melange - CSE Alumni Meet: The annual alumni meet of the department of Computer Science and Engineering organized by the CSE Alumni Association since 2015.

ECE Alumni Association 

The ECE Alumni Association  is a voluntary organization of the faculty, ex-students and present students of the department.

CSE Alumni Association 
The CSE Alumni Association is a platform for Alumni, Students & Faculty of CSE department to connect & interact. It was formed to engage the CSE department as well as its global community to support and advance the program's excellence. The association organizes different alumni activity like seminars/talks all around the year. The Association also organizes its annual reunion, "Melange" in the month of October every year.

Aikatan: EIE Alumni Association 
Aikatan, meaning 'Harmony', is the official Alumni association of Applied Electronics and Instrumentation Engineering department of Netaji Subhash Engineering College. It was founded in 2014 to promote interaction among the alumni and the students of the Instrumentation department. The association organizes its annual reunion, "Samhar" in March every year since 2015.

See also
 West Bengal University of Technology
 National Board of Accreditation

References

External links

 

 

Engineering colleges in Kolkata
Colleges affiliated to West Bengal University of Technology
Memorials to Subhas Chandra Bose
Educational institutions established in 1998
1998 establishments in West Bengal